Beni Ansar (Tarifit: Bni Nṣaa, ⴱⵏⵉ ⵏⵚⴰⴰ; Arabic: بني أنصار; Spanish: Beni Ensar) is a town in Nador Province, Oriental, Morocco, located 12 km (7½ miles) north of the city of Nador. It is bordered on the north by the Spanish-controlled city of Melilla. According to the 2014 census, Beni Ensar has a population of 56,582, and its area is 20 hectares (50 acres).

The port of Beni Ansar is one of the main ports of Morocco, serving the city of Nador (Beni Ansar port is usually referred to as Nador Port). The urban area is bordered on the west by Mount Gurugu (Adraa n Gurugu) and a highway, and on the east by the Lagoon of Nador (Mar Chica or Řebḥaa Ameẓẓyan), the railway, and the industrial zone around the port.

References

Populated places in Nador Province